Joseph Fala (born December 29, 1997) is an American soccer player who plays as a defender.

Career

Youth
Raised in the Cape May Court House section of Middle Township, New Jersey, Fala attended Middle Township High School, where he played basketball and tennis, in addition to soccer. He played college soccer from 2016 through 2019 with Ramapo Roadrunners. During his college career Fala played as a striker, appearing in 75 matches and scoring 47 goals and providing 17 assists.

Professional
On March 5, 2020, Fala was signed by New York Red Bulls II after impressing in a club combine while playing as a defender. He made his professional debut on March 7, starting in a 1–0 loss against Tampa Bay Rowdies.

He was released by Red Bulls II on November 30, 2020.

References

External links
Joe Fala at Ramapo College Athletics

1997 births
Living people
Middle Township High School alumni
New York Red Bulls II players
People from Middle Township, New Jersey
Sportspeople from Cape May County, New Jersey
USL Championship players
American soccer players
Association football defenders
National Premier Soccer League players
Soccer players from New Jersey